Ellisville, also known as Coloma, is an unincorporated community in Cherokee County, Alabama, United States.

History
Ellisville was named for Wyatt Ellis Sr. who kept a store in the community. A post office operated under the name Coloma from 1850 to 1907. Company I of the 19th Regiment Alabama Infantry, known as the "Cherokee Rangers", mustered at Coloma on August 10, 1861.

References

Unincorporated communities in Cherokee County, Alabama
1850 establishments in Alabama
Unincorporated communities in Alabama